Jamieson Place is a  office building in the city's downtown core of Calgary, Alberta, Canada. At the time of its completion in 2009, the  Jamiseson Place was the third tallest office tower in Calgary.

The building's winter garden is home to three hanging glass chandeliers by artist Dale Chihuly.

History
Bentall Capital on behalf of the property owner British Columbia Investment Management Corporation, tasked Gibbs Gage Architects to design a structure at the corner of 2nd Street and 4th Avenue SW. The design included connections to the city's Plus 15 network, and a three-story indoor winter garden. The complex would also include a five level underground parkade with 500 stalls, totaling .

Groundbreaking for $300-million (equivalent to $-million in ) project occurred in January 2007 and construction completed in December 2009. Following construction Jamieson Place has earned BOMA Platinum status and LEED Gold status. 

Jamieson Place was named in honour of Alice Jamieson, a resident of Calgary who in 1914 became the first female appointed to the judiciary in the British Empire.

As of 2020, Skyscraper Center, a project of the Council on Tall Buildings and Urban Habitat lists Jamieson place as the 12th tallest building in Calgary and 64th tallest in Canada.

Gallery

See also
List of tallest buildings in Calgary
Jamieson Place, a residential neighbourhood in west Edmonton, Alberta.

References

External links

Jamieson Place

Skyscrapers in Calgary
Office buildings completed in 2009
Skyscraper office buildings in Canada
2009 establishments in Alberta